Alfonso Rodríguez (born 15 November 1948) is a Puerto Rican weightlifter. He competed in the men's middleweight event at the 1972 Summer Olympics.

References

1948 births
Living people
Puerto Rican male weightlifters
Olympic weightlifters of Puerto Rico
Weightlifters at the 1972 Summer Olympics
Place of birth missing (living people)
20th-century Puerto Rican people